Payette County is a county located in Idaho in the United States of America. As of the 2010 census, the population was 22,623. The county seat and largest city is Payette.

Payette County is part of the Ontario micropolitan area.

History
The county was established in 1917, partitioned from Canyon County. It was named after the Payette River, which was named after French-Canadian François Payette. 
Originally a fur trapper with the North West Company, Payette was the first white man in the area in 1818.

Payette County is one of the few counties in Idaho to be the home to the endangered Idaho ground squirrel.

Geography
It is the smallest county in Idaho by area.

Adjacent counties
 Washington County - north
 Gem County - east
 Canyon County - south
 Malheur County, Oregon - west

National protected area
Deer Flat National Wildlife Refuge (part)

Rivers
Snake River
Payette River

Highways
 I 84
 US 30
 US 95
 SH-52
 SH-72

Demographics

2000 census
As of the census of 2000, there were 20,578 people, 7,371 households, and 5,572 families living in the county. There were 7,949 housing units at an average density of 20 per square mile (8/km2). The racial makeup of the county was 90.25% White, 0.87% Native American, 0.85% Asian, 0.10% Black or African American,  0.03% Pacific Islander, 5.57% from other races, and 2.33% from two or more races.  11.92% of the population were Hispanic or Latino of any race. 19.5% were of German, 13.5% English, 12.3% American and 8.3% Irish ancestry.

There were 7,371 households, out of which 37.70% had children under the age of 18 living with them, 62.00% were married couples living together, 9.30% had a female householder with no husband present, and 24.40% were non-families. 20.60% of all households were made up of individuals, and 9.50% had someone living alone who was 65 years of age or older.  The average household size was 2.78 and the average family size was 3.21.

In the county, the population was spread out, with 30.60% under the age of 18, 7.90% from 18 to 24, 26.60% from 25 to 44, 21.70% from 45 to 64, and 13.20% who were 65 years of age or older.  The median age was 34 years. For every 100 females, there were 98.30 males.  For every 100 females age 18 and over, there were 94.80 males.

The median income for a household in the county was $33,046, and the median income for a family was $37,430. Males had a median income of $30,641 versus $21,421 for females. The per capita income for the county was $14,924.  About 9.70% of families and 13.20% of the population were below the poverty line, including 16.70% of those under age 18 and 12.20% of those age 65 or over.

2010 census
As of the 2010 United States Census, there were 22,623 people, 8,262 households, and 6,017 families living in the county. The racial makeup of the county was 88.6% white, 1.1% American Indian, 0.8% Asian, 0.2% black or African American, 0.1% Pacific islander, 6.3% from other races, and 2.8% from two or more races. Those of Hispanic or Latino origin made up 14.9% of the population. In terms of ancestry, 18.9% were American, 16.8% were German, 13.2% were English, and 10.5% were Irish.

Of the 8,262 households, 37.2% had children under the age of 18 living with them, 57.4% were married couples living together, 10.4% had a female householder with no husband present, 27.2% were non-families, and 22.1% of all households were made up of individuals. The average household size was 2.73 and the average family size was 3.19. The median age was 37.2 years.

The median income for a household in the county was $43,559 and the median income for a family was $50,323. Males had a median income of $38,582 versus $25,826 for females. The per capita income for the county was $18,814. About 12.0% of families and 15.7% of the population were below the poverty line, including 22.6% of those under age 18 and 9.3% of those age 65 or over.

2020 census
Note: the US Census treats Hispanic/Latino as an ethnic category. This table excludes Latinos from the racial categories and assigns them to a separate category. Hispanics/Latinos can be of any race.

As of the 2020 United States census, there were 25,386 people, 9,086 households, and 6,275 families residing in the county.

Education
The county is served by three school districts:

Payette Joint District 371
 Payette High School
 McCain Middle School
 Payette Primary School
 Westside Elementary School
 Payette Night School

New Plymouth District 372
 New Plymouth High School
 New Plymouth Middle School
 New Plymouth Elementary School

Fruitland District 373
 Fruitland High School
 Fruitland Middle School
 Fruitland Elementary School
 Fruitland Alternative School

Communities

Cities
Fruitland
New Plymouth
Payette

Unincorporated community
Hamilton Corner

Politics
Like most of Idaho, Payette County voters are overwhelmingly Republican. In no presidential election since 1936 has the county selected the Democratic candidate, and Jimmy Carter in 1976 was the last Democrat to crack one third of the county's vote.

See also
National Register of Historic Places listings in Payette County, Idaho

References

 http://www.sde.idaho.gov/site/edu_directory/docs/Educational%20Directory.pdf

External links
Payette County from the Idaho Museum of Natural History
County website
State profile of Payette County
University of Idaho Extension for Payette County
Payette County USGenWeb

 
Idaho counties
1917 establishments in Idaho
Populated places established in 1917
Ontario, Oregon micropolitan area